Tajinder Singh (born 25 May 1992) is an Indian cricketer.

Career
Tajinder made his Twenty20 debut for Rajasthan in the 2016–17 Inter State Twenty-20 Tournament on 30 January 2017. He made his List A debut for Rajasthan in the 2016–17 Vijay Hazare Trophy on 25 February 2017.

Tajinder made his first-class debut for Rajasthan in the 2017–18 Ranji Trophy on 6 October 2017. In his next match, on 14 October 2017 against Jharkhand, he scored his maiden first-class century.

In January 2018, Tajinder was bought by the Mumbai Indians in the 2018 IPL auction. In the 2020 IPL auction, he was bought by the Kings XI Punjab ahead of the 2020 Indian Premier League.

References

External links
 

1992 births
Living people
Indian cricketers
Rajasthan cricketers
Cricketers from Rajasthan